The Trombetas is a large river on the northern side of the Amazon River.

Course

The Trombetas river gives birth to very many rivers, including the Anamu river.
It is formed by the junction of the Poana and Anuma rivers on the border between Brazil and Guyana.
It runs through the municipalities of Oriximiná, Terra Santa, Óbidos and Faro.
In the Saracá-Taquera National Forest the main streams in the Trombetas basin are the Papagaio, Água Fria, Moura, Jamari, Ajará, Terra Preta and Saracá.

Its confluence with the Amazon is just west of the town of Óbidos, Pará in Brazil. Its sources is in the Guiana highlands, but its long course is frequently interrupted by violent currents, rocky barriers, and rapids. The inferior zone of the river, as far up as the first fall, the Porteira, has but little broken water and is low and swampy; but above the long series of cataracts and rapids the character and aspect of the valley completely change, and the climate is much better.
The river reaches its highest levels in April and May, since the rainy season usually peaks in April.

Region

The river flows through the Uatuma-Trombetas moist forests ecoregion.
The river basin lies partly within the  Grão-Pará Ecological Station, the largest fully protected tropical forest conservation unit on the planet.
South of the ecological station it flows through the  Trombetas State Forest from north to south.

See also 
Oriximiná Airport
Porto Trombetas Airport

References

Sources

Tributaries of the Amazon River
Rivers of Pará